Neoacla is a genus of crickets belonging to the family Phalangopsidae.

Its native range is Southern America.

Species:

Neoacla clandestina 
Neoacla loiselae 
Neoacla reticulata 
Neoacla vicina

References

Ensifera
Ensifera genera